Kamen Rider vs. Shocker (仮面ライダー対ショッカー, Kamen Raidā Tai Shokkā) is a Japanese short tokusatsu superhero film based on the original Kamen Rider TV series. It's the second Kamen Rider movie ever after Go Go Kamen Rider and the first one that isn't a theatrical version of an episode. It was followed by Kamen Rider vs. Ambassador Hell.

The movie is notable for being the first time Takeshi Hongo/Kamen Rider 1 uses his iconic transformation pose.

Plot 
Famous Professor Daidoji completes his innovational GX device, which would allow its owner to control gravity. Suddenly, Daidoji, together with his assistant, is attacked by Doctor Death from an evil secret organization Shocker. He threatens the professor and after killing his assistant he requires the device. However, Professor Daidoji manages to escape.

While driving in his car, the professor is pursued by Shocker monsters once again. Using a visual trick, a monster learns that a formula needed to activate the device is with Daidoji's daughter. After that, Kamen Rider 2 arrives at the scene and protects the professor from the terrible monsters.

During the celebration of her birthday, Daidoji's daughter, Tamami, is attacked by Shocker. Kamen Rider 1, arriving from his foreign travels, appears and fights back. However, Shocker manages to kidnap Tamami. When thinking of potential future actions, Doctor Death calls the Tachibana Racing Club and offers to exchange Daidoji for his daughter.

After the exchange in the Hell Valley, Doctor Death reveals that all this time it was his trick and he has no intention to let Kamen Rider 2, who accompanied the professor, leave alive. However, it turns out Professor Daidoji isn't actually him, but Takeshi Hongo. After the long fight, Kamen Riders 1 and 2 finally destroy the only remaining Shocker cyborg.

Cast 
 Takeshi Sasaki as Hayato Ichimonji/Kamen Rider 2
 Hiroshi Fujioka as Takeshi Hongo/Kamen Rider 1
 Jiro Chiba as Kazuya Taki
 Hideyo Amamoto as Doctor Death
 Wakako Oki as Yuri
 Emily Takami as Emi
 Yuko Sugibayashi as Mika
 Yasuharu Miura as Goro
 Hajime Izu as Odori Daido
 Hiroyuki Miya as Ano's assistant
 Hiroko Saito as Tamami Daidoji
 Mitsuomi Ishihara as Goro's classmate

Production 
The film was shot in 1972, around the time the 46th episode of the TV series was shooting. The movie's shooting lasted only 3 days.

Release 
Kamen Rider vs. Shocker was released theatrically on March 18, 1972, the same day the 51st episode of the TV series it is based on aired on TV.

Physical 
Kamen Rider vs. Shocker was originally released on VHS on April 21, 2000. In later releases, it was packed together with other Kamen Rider movies of the Showa era. The movie was released on DVD with two others Kamen Rider Ichigo films, while for its Blu-ray release, it was packed with other Showa films prior to Kamen Rider Amazon: The Movie, with exception of Go Go Kamen Rider and Kamen Rider V3: The Movie. In 2021, commemorating franchise's 50th anniversary, it was remastered in 4K and released in the Kamen Rider: The Movie 1972-1988 4K Remaster Box.

Digital 
The movie is available on Toei Tokusatsu Fan Club streaming service for the Japanese audience. It was also shows on the official Japanese YouTube channel on November 11, 2021. For the worldwide audience, Kamen Rider vs. Shocker was available with English subtitles for limited time on the official English YouTube channel starting with January 22, 2022, where it was titled MASKED RIDER vs. Shocker.

References

Sources 
 
 
 
 
 
 
 
 
 
 『KODANSHA Official File Magazine 仮面ライダー』（講談社）
 
 
 
 
 
 
 
 
 
 

 

1972 films
Kamen Rider films
Japanese superhero films
1970s superhero films
Tokusatsu films
1970s Japanese films